Schoenberger Hall was a historic residential building located at Asheville, Buncombe County, North Carolina.  It was built in 1887, and was a 2 1/2-story, brick dwelling.  It featured an Eastlake-detailed wraparound verandah and a slate-shingled mansard roof.  The building was the former home of the Ravenscroft Associate Missions and Training School of the North Carolina Episcopal Diocese and the former residence of the Bishop of the Episcopal Diocese of Western North Carolina. The building has been demolished.

It was listed on the National Register of Historic Places in 1979.

References

Residential buildings on the National Register of Historic Places in North Carolina
Queen Anne architecture in North Carolina
Buildings and structures completed in 1887
Buildings and structures in Asheville, North Carolina
National Register of Historic Places in Buncombe County, North Carolina